Robert Maioli O'Neil was an American football guard, defensive end and linebacker who played three seasons with the Pittsburgh Steelers and the New York Titans in the NFL. He played college football at Duquesne University for the Duquesne Dukes football team and the Notre Dame Fighting Irish football team. He also played for the Calgary Stampeders and Montreal Alouettes of the Canadian Football League.

References

External links
Just Sports Stats

1931 births
2012 deaths
People from Bridgeville, Pennsylvania 
Players of American football from Pennsylvania
American football guards
American football defensive ends
Canadian football guards
Canadian football defensive linemen
Canadian football linebackers
American players of Canadian football
Pittsburgh Steelers players
Calgary Stampeders players
Montreal Alouettes players
New York Titans (AFL) players
American football linebackers
Duquesne Dukes football players
Notre Dame Fighting Irish football players